Christophe Laporte (born 11 December 1992 in La Seyne-sur-Mer) is a French cyclist, who currently rides for UCI WorldTeam .

He was named in the Team Cofidis start list for the Tour de France for seven consecutive years between 2015 and 2021, completing all but one of them.

In 2022 he joined Jumbo-Visma, among the most powerful teams in cycling, and in his first major stage race with the team led the podium sweep with Primož Roglič and Wout Van Aert on stage 1 of Paris–Nice. In the 2022 Tour de France, he was a key teammate of leader Jonas Vingegaard, was instrumental in helping the team win three different jerseys, and also won stage 19 at Cahors. This was a rare win in that he attacked after the sprint trains were already operating at top speed, and actually held off the remaining elite sprinters long enough to win the stage.

Major results

2012
 1st Stage 2 Tour de Moselle
 5th Road race, National Under-23 Road Championships
2013
 1st Stage 3 Tour de la Manche
 2nd  Road race, Mediterranean Games
 5th Road race, Jeux de la Francophonie
 6th La Côte Picarde
 7th Gran Premio Industrie del Marmo
2014
 6th La Roue Tourangelle
2015
 1st Tour de Vendée
 3rd Le Samyn
 3rd Grand Prix de Wallonie
 9th Overall Driedaagse van West-Vlaanderen
2016
 6th Paris–Bourges
2017
 1st Tour de Vendée
 5th Paris–Bourges
 7th Overall Étoile de Bessèges
 8th Overall Danmark Rundt
2018
 1st Tro-Bro Léon
 Tour La Provence
1st  Points classification
1st Stages 1 & 3
 1st Stage 1 Tour de Luxembourg
 1st Stage 3 (ITT) Tour of Belgium
 2nd Overall Étoile de Bessèges
1st Stage 2
 2nd Grand Prix d'Isbergues
 3rd Paris–Bourges
 4th Gent–Wevelgem
 5th Grand Prix de Fourmies
2019
 1st  Overall Tour Poitou-Charentes en Nouvelle-Aquitaine
1st Stages 1, 2 & 4 (ITT)
 1st  Overall Étoile de Bessèges
1st  Points classification
1st Stages 2 & 4 (ITT)
 Tour de Luxembourg
1st Prologue & Stage 1
 2nd Tour de Vendée
 2nd Duo Normand (with Anthony Perez)
 3rd Grand Prix d'Isbergues
 6th Grand Prix de Wallonie
 9th Dwars door Vlaanderen
2021
 1st Grand Prix de Wallonie
 1st Circuit de Wallonie
 Étoile de Bessèges
1st  Points classification
1st Stage 1
 1st Stage 1 Tour de Limousin
 2nd Dwars door Vlaanderen
 5th Time trial, National Road Championships
 6th Paris–Roubaix
 7th Eschborn–Frankfurt
 9th Tro-Bro Léon
2022
 1st  Overall Danmark Rundt
1st  Points classification
1st Stage 5
 1st Binche–Chimay–Binche
 1st Stage 19 Tour de France
 1st Stage 1 Paris–Nice
 2nd  Road race, UCI Road World Championships
 2nd E3 Saxo Bank Classic
 2nd Gent–Wevelgem
 8th Kuurne–Brussels–Kuurne
 9th Tour of Flanders
2023
 3rd Omloop Het Nieuwsblad
 6th Kuurne–Brussels–Kuurne

Grand Tour general classification results timeline

Classic results timeline

References

External links

1992 births
Living people
People from La Seyne-sur-Mer
French male cyclists
Sportspeople from Var (department)
French Tour de France stage winners
Mediterranean Games silver medalists for France
Mediterranean Games medalists in cycling
Competitors at the 2013 Mediterranean Games
Cyclists from Provence-Alpes-Côte d'Azur
Danmark Rundt winners